Taylan 'Tiny' May (born 19 August 2001) is a Samoa international rugby league footballer who plays as a er for the Penrith Panthers in the NRL.

Background
He played junior rugby league for the Minchinbury Jets

Playing career

2021
In round 21 of the 2021 NRL season, May made his debut for Penrith against the Sydney Roosters.

2022
In round 3 of the 2022 NRL season, May scored a hat-trick in Penrith's 38-20 victory over Newcastle. 

The following round against South Sydney in the Grand Final rematch, he scored two tries in Penrith's 26-16 win.  In the 2022 Qualifying Final, May was sent to the sin bin for a dangerous high tackle and later suffered a hamstring injury in Penrith's 27-8 victory over Parramatta. May missed Penrith's 2022 NRL Grand Final victory over Parramatta due to injury.

In October May was named in the Samoa squad for the 2021 Rugby League World Cup. In the third group stage match at the 2021 Rugby League World Cup, May scored four tries for Samoa in their 62-4 victory over France.

2023
On 18 February, May played in Penrith's 13-12 upset loss to St Helens RFC in the 2023 World Club Challenge.
On 20 February, it was confirmed that May would miss the entire 2023 NRL season after tearing his ACL during Penrith's World Club Challenge loss.

Personal life
On April 6, 2022, May was charged by Queensland police with assault occasioning bodily harm.  The charge relates to an incident that occurred in November 2021, while May was on leave following the 2021 NRL season.
He is 1-0 in his professional boxing career, fighting on the undercard of Paul Gallen against Darcy Lussick, beating Sydney Roosters hooker Freddy Lussick.  On 31 August 2022, May was found guilty of assaulting a man which occurred following Penrith's 2021 NRL Grand Final victory.  May was ordered to pay a $1000 fine and no criminal conviction was recorded.
On 7 September, May was suspended for two matches by the NRL and fined, however May's suspension was backdated until the start of the 2023 NRL season which meant he was allowed to participate in the 2022 finals series.

He is the brother of rugby league players Tyrone May and Terrell May.

He plays under the name 'Tiny May' for Samoa.

References

External links

Penrith Panthers profile
Samoa profile

2001 births
Living people
Australian rugby league players
Australian sportspeople of Samoan descent
Taylan
Penrith Panthers players
Rugby league centres
Rugby league wingers
Rugby league players from Blacktown
Samoa national rugby league team players